The following article presents a summary of the 1907 football (soccer) season in Paraguay.

Liga Paraguaya results
The championship was played for the "Copa El Diario", a trophy issued by the newspaper of the same name. It was won again by the previous year's winner, Guaraní.

References
 Paraguay - League History 1906-1964 by Karel Stokkermans at RSSSF
 Historia de la APF

External links
 APF Website

Paraguayan Primera División seasons
Para
1